John Turner (24 August 1864 – 9 August 1934) was an English-born anarcho-communist shop steward. He referred to himself as "of semi-Quaker descent."

Turner was the first person to be ordered deported from the United States for violation of the 1903 Anarchist Exclusion Act. Turner was a member of the Socialist League, but left to become a member of the Freedom Group (UK), and later on became general secretary of the Shop Assistants' Union that he founded. At one point, the union attempted to nominate Turner for Parliament, but he declined, preferring not to "waste his time in parliamentary debates". Turner worked on several publications in addition to Freedom. He was a member of the collective putting out Commonweal, and also the editor of Freedom's syndicalist journal The Voice of Labour, which denounced the "blight of respectability" of mainstream labour unions. The paper began as a weekly in 1907, and advocated direct action and the general strike.

The same year, Turner, along with Guy Aldred and others, formed the Industrial Union of Direct Action. Turner was also elected (in absentia) to the International Bureau of the Anarchist International, formed at the International Anarchist Congress of Amsterdam. Throughout the many changes in Freedom's history, Turner was its publisher from the time it was renamed Freedom: A Journal of Libertarian Thought, Work and Literature in 1930 until his death in 1934.

After the Russian Revolution, Turner traveled to Russia as part of the British Labour Delegation, and attempted to help Aron Baron acquire reprieve from a death sentence. Baron was subsequently charged with having "aroused public sentiment abroad against his imprisonment in the Solovietzki and having induced revolutionists visiting Russia to seek his release." Baron was then sent to a prison in Siberia.

Deportation from the United States
Turner had spent 7 months of 1896 (at which time he met Voltairine de Cleyre) lecturing throughout the U.S. He returned to the U.S. in October 1903, just 7 months after enactment of the Anarchist Exclusion Act, which barred anyone from entering the country who held anarchist views. He was arrested on October 23, after giving a lecture at the Murray Hill Lyceum. When searched Immigration officials found a copy of Johann Most's Free Society, and Turner's speaking schedule, which included a memorial to the Haymarket Martyrs. This was enough to order his deportation. Turner was held in detention at Ellis Island for three months awaiting appeal of his case to the U.S. Supreme Court. Before the final ruling, Turner was released on US$5,000 bail. He then gave some lectures around the country, wrongly speculating that the Supreme Court would declare the law unconstitutional and returned to England before the judgment came down against him.

Notes

Further reading

"ANARCHISTS ARE RAIDED; Murray Hill Lyceum Meeting Goes Wild with Rage. JOHN TURNER TAKEN OFF STAGE Locked Up at Ellis Island on Warrant from Washington, Which Charges Inciting to Anarchy", The New York Times, October 24, 1903, page 1.
"Anarchism and the Assassination of McKinley", Sidney Fine, The American Historical Review, Vol. 60, No. 4 (Jul., 1955), pp. 777–799

1865 births
1934 deaths
Anarcho-communists
English anarchists
General Secretaries of the National Amalgamated Union of Shop Assistants, Warehousemen and Clerks
Members of the General Council of the Trades Union Congress
Scottish anarchists
Socialist League (UK, 1885) members
People deported from the United States
British cooperative organizers